Harry Clement "Bud" Sketchley (March 30, 1919 – December 19, 1979) was a right fielder in Major League Baseball. He played for the Chicago White Sox.

References

External links

1919 births
1979 deaths
Baseball people from Manitoba
Canadian expatriate baseball players in the United States
Chicago White Sox players
Major League Baseball right fielders
Waterloo Hawks (baseball) players
Major League Baseball players from Canada
People from Virden, Manitoba
Hollywood High School alumni
Canadian emigrants to the United States